The Appleton Baronetcy, of South Benfleet in the County of Essex, was a title in the Baronetage of England. It was created on 29 June 1611 for Roger Appleton. The title became extinct on the death of the sixth Baronet in 1708.

Appleton baronets, of South Benfleet (1611)
Sir Roger Appleton, 1st Baronet (died 1613)
Sir Henry Appleton, 2nd Baronet (died 1649)
Sir Henry Appleton, 3rd Baronet (died 1670)
Sir Henry Appleton, 4th Baronet (died 1679)
Sir William Appleton, 5th Baronet (–1705)
Sir Henry Appleton, 6th Baronet (died 1708)

References

 

Extinct baronetcies in the Baronetage of England